Dryadella simula is a species of orchid.

simula